William Baring may refer to:

Bingham Baring, 2nd Baron Ashburton (William Bingham Baring, 1799–1864), British politician and businessman
William S. Baring-Gould (1913–1967), English Sherlock Holmes scholar
William Baring du Pré (1875–1946), British politician